Saadi Abbas Jalbani was born on 1 January 1988 in Karachi, Pakistan. He is a Pakistani karate competitor and captain of Pakistan National Karate team. In 2011, Saadi became the first ever Asian Champion in all South Asian region, he is currently playing as a professional from Al-Ittihad Kalba club.

Biography
Jalbani was born in 1988 in  Lyari Town Karachi South. He started Karate in 1996 when he was 7 years old, Saadi has earned a black belt in karate on 15 April 2001. In 2018, he became the captain of Pakistan National Karate Team and joined WAPDA Karate team in 2007 As of 2014, he was the only karate competitor from South Asia who has won a gold medal at an Asian Karate Championship.

References

External links

Facebook page

1988 births
Living people
Pakistani male karateka
Karateka at the 2006 Asian Games
Karateka at the 2010 Asian Games
Karateka at the 2014 Asian Games
Karateka at the 2018 Asian Games
Asian Games competitors for Pakistan
South Asian Games gold medalists for Pakistan
South Asian Games silver medalists for Pakistan
South Asian Games medalists in karate
Islamic Solidarity Games medalists in karate
20th-century Pakistani people
21st-century Pakistani people